Yelena Vladimirovna Mikulich  (born 21 February 1977 in Minsk) is a Belarus rower.

References 
 
 

1977 births
Living people
Belarusian female rowers
Sportspeople from Minsk
Rowers at the 1996 Summer Olympics
Olympic bronze medalists for Belarus
Olympic rowers of Belarus
Olympic medalists in rowing
Medalists at the 1996 Summer Olympics
World Rowing Championships medalists for Belarus